Pino Suárez is a station on Line 1 and Line 2 of the Mexico City Metro system.  It is located in the Cuauhtémoc borough of Mexico City, on the southern part of the city center. Starting 11 July 2022, the Line 1 station will remain closed for at least eight months for modernization work on the tunnel and the line's technical equipment.

Name and pictogram
The station is named after José María Pino Suárez, Vice President of Mexico during the term of Francisco I. Madero (1911–1913).  However, the station logo depicts a pyramid dedicated to Ehecatl, the Aztec god of wind.  This pyramid was discovered in the early construction of the station and it can be seen on display along the main transfer corridor.

General information
The station is located at the intersection of José María Pino Suárez and José María Izazaga avenues in downtown Mexico City, a few blocks from the Zócalo.

The Ehecatl pyramid was found during the construction of the station in 1967. While excavating was unearthed a round-shaped altar and was decided to let the pyramid remains and allow the National Institute of Archeology and History (INAH) to preserve and maintain it.

This pyramid is the smallest archaeological zone in Mexico and is thought to have been part of a larger ceremonial center. The Ehecatl pyramid has 4 structural construction stages and it counts on a circular base that functioned as a pedestal for the deity placed at the top. Inside the pyramid have been found a few offerings.

Pino Suárez was opened on 5 September 1969. The station is an important link to the centre of the city. It was the first transfer station of the network and it connects the two busiest lines. Pino Suárez has many corridors, the most notable among them being the Pasaje Zócalo–Pino Suárez that connects with Metro Zócalo at the north side, filled with bookstores and a mini-cinema; other corridors have cultural displays and temporary exhibitions.  The station also has an information desk.

Ridership

Exits

Line 1
North: Av. José María Izazaga and Av. José María Pino Suárez, Col. Centro 
West: Av. José María Izazaga and Av. José María Pino Suárez, Col. Centro

Line 2
South: San Lucas street and Av. Fray Servando Teresa de Mier, Col. Centro 
North: Av. José María Izazaga and Calzada San Antonio Abad, Col. Centro

Gallery

See also 
 List of Mexico City metro stations

References

External links 
 
 
 Pyramid of Pino Suarez, "Mexican Routes" [mexicanroutes.com]

Mexico City Metro Line 1 stations
Railway stations opened in 1969
1969 establishments in Mexico
Railway stations opened in 1970
1970 establishments in Mexico
Mexico City Metro Line 2 stations
Mexico City Metro stations in Cuauhtémoc, Mexico City
Accessible Mexico City Metro stations